Madou may refer to:

In Brussels, Belgium:
 Place Mandou, near the Small ring
 Madou Plaza Tower, Saint-Josse-ten-Noode
 Madou metro station

In other places:
 Madou, Tainan, Taiwan
 Madou, Burkina Faso

People with the name
People with the surname:
 Jean Baptiste Madou (1796–1877), Belgian painter and illustrator

People with the given name:
 Madou Dossama (born 1972), Burkinabé football player

See also
 Madou Monogatari, series of Japanese role-playing video games